Undercover is a six-part BBC television drama series co-produced with BBC America which was first broadcast beginning 3 April 2016. The series premiered in the United States as a six-hour miniseries on 16 and 17 November 2016 on BBC America; it began its run on the CBC in Canada in August (it has aired Mondays at 9pm/9:30 NT, premiering 22 August 2016) and on Canal + in France since January 2017.

For her performance in the series, Sophie Okonedo won the Royal Television Society Award for Actor: Female in 2017.

Plot
Undercover follows the lives and family of Maya Cobbina, a British lawyer conducting a long-term legal fight to prove the innocence of US death row inmate Rudy Jones, and her husband Nick Johnson. After Cobbina is head-hunted for the position of Director of Public Prosecutions, her husband's past – and the circumstances under which the couple first met twenty years earlier – comes back to haunt him.

Cast
Characters include:

 Maya Cobbina QC (Sophie Okonedo), a criminal law and human rights barrister, later Director of Public Prosecutions
 Nick Johnson (Adrian Lester), a former undercover Detective Sergeant with the Metropolitan Police
 Rudy Jones (Dennis Haysbert), an American prisoner on death row in Louisiana
 Paul Brightman (Derek Riddell), a security service officer and former undercover policeman
 Dominic Carter (Vincent Regan), Nick's handler during his days as an undercover officer
 Robert Greenlaw (Alistair Petrie), the Minister of State for Justice
 Clemency 'Clem' Johnson (Tamara Lawrance), Maya and Nick's 19-year-old daughter
 Dan Johnson (Daniel Ezra), Maya and Nick's 18-year-old son, who has a learning disability
 Ella Johnson (Shannon Hayes), Maya and Nick's youngest child
 Abigail Strickland (Leanne Best), a former undercover Metropolitan Police officer
 John Halliday (Mark Bonnar), the Crown Prosecution Service Chief Executive and Maya's deputy
 Michael Antwi (Sope Dirisu), an anti-racism campaigner
 Julia Redhead (Angel Coulby), a tabloid reporter for the Daily Metro and Maya's best friend
 Jimmy (Phil Davis), an employee in Maya's chambers
 Dr. Francis (John Schwab)

Production
The series was written by Peter Moffat, directed by James Hawes and produced by Richard Stokes.
Moffat took inspiration for the fictional drama from real-life revelations about British police officers who had formed long-term relationships with activists they were investigating while undercover, as well as from the London Metropolitan Police Service's secret surveillance of the family of murdered teenager Stephen Lawrence.

Episodes

Critical reception
The opening episode was watched by 5.2 million viewers (a 24.1% share). Writing in British daily newspaper The Guardian, Chitra Ramaswamy admitted: "I came to Peter Moffat's excellent drama knowing nothing and was instantly confused, though gripped nonetheless. Why was it called Undercover when it's about a lawyer on the brink of becoming the first black director of public prosecutions? […] Turns out it's called Undercover because of what awaits Maya at home. […] As well as being the ideal husband, Nick is an ex-undercover cop who has been deceiving his wife for 20 years." She added: "Thankfully Moffat's writing is so good and the direction so assured I didn't mind not having a clue what was going on, even if at times it felt like at least three different dramas were playing out in tandem." Ramaswamy judged Okonedo "a brilliant and criminally underused actor in Britain; warm, honest, fierce yet vulnerable. It's wonderful to see her getting a role she deserves. It's also a testament to Lester that his Nick is so likable, a compassionate family man mired in a hell of his own making."

Adaptations
A South Korean adaptation titled Undercover (produced by JTBC Studios and Story TV) started airing on JTBC since April 23, 2021.

References

External links
 

2016 British television series debuts
2016 British television series endings
2010s British drama television series
BBC television dramas
2010s British television miniseries
English-language television shows
Television shows set in London